Stellar Blade is an upcoming action-adventure game developed by Korean studio Shift Up and set to be released by publisher Sony Interactive Entertainment in 2023 for the PlayStation 5.

Gameplay 
Stellar Blade is played from a third-person perspective. The gameplay is split into two parts: combat and exploration. Combat focuses on countering enemy attacks and proceeding to use combo skills and items to defeat enemies. Skills are acquired after spending Beta Gauge (BG). BG is gained after successfully parrying and evading in battle. A Burst Gauge meter is also filled up by parrying enemy attacks and executing combos, which can then be activated to grant buffs or use powerful attacks against enemies. The game also utilizes the PlayStation 5 DualSense controller's haptic feedback in order to deliver feedback on enemy attacks and weapon accuracy. Exploration around the game world features wall scaling and swinging on ropes in order to traverse the environment and find hidden secrets, such as extra costumes.

Story 
In the near future, humanity is driven from the Earth after a losing a war against alien invaders called NA:tives. To reclaim the Earth, the protagonist Eve and her squad are deployed from the Colony to fight the NA:tives and take back Earth. Eventually, Eve meets a survivor named Adam, who leads her to Xion, the last surviving human city on Earth. Eve then makes contact with the elder Orcal and establishes relationships with the residents of Xion in order to further her mission to save Earth.

Development 
The game was first revealed via a teaser trailer under the working title Project Eve on April 4, 2019 for PlayStation 4, Xbox One, and Microsoft Windows to be developed on Unreal Engine 4 by Shift Up, a company founded by Blade & Soul illustrator Kim Hyung-tae. A prototype for new gameplay and art direction was shown in late 2020 without mentioning any of the game's platforms for release. The game was later announced to be an exclusive for the PlayStation 5 during a September 2021 PlayStation showcase. In a September 2022 State of Play, the game's final title was revealed to be Stellar Blade with new gameplay shown off and a release window scheduled for 2023.

References

External links
 

PlayStation 5 games
PlayStation 5-only games
Sony Interactive Entertainment games
Video games developed in South Korea
Action-adventure games
Science fiction video games
Hack and slash games
Post-apocalyptic video games
Unreal Engine games
Video games featuring female protagonists
Single-player video games
Upcoming video games scheduled for 2023
Shift Up games